was a Japanese football player. He played for Japan national team.

Club career
Abe played for Kwangaku Club was consisted of his alma mater Kwansei Gakuin University players and graduates. He played with many Japan national team players Yukio Goto, Hideo Sakai and so on.

National team career
In May 1934, Abe was selected Japan national team for 1934 Far Eastern Championship Games in Manila. At this competition, on 13 May, he debuted against Dutch East Indies. On 15 May, he also played against Philippines. He played 2 games for Japan in 1934.

National team statistics

References

External links
 
 Japan National Football Team Database

Year of birth missing
Year of death missing
Kwansei Gakuin University alumni
Japanese footballers
Japan international footballers
Association football defenders